Pittsburgh Fair Witness was a radical counterculture underground newspaper published in Pittsburgh, Pennsylvania from 1970 to 1973. The first 9 monthly issues were published starting in February 1970 under the title Grok. Beginning with vol. 1, no. 10 (Nov. 4-25, 1970) the title was changed to Pittsburgh Fair Witness and the paper shifted to publication once every three weeks; starting with the Dec. 3-17, 1971 issue it published on a biweekly schedule until its demise with vol. 4, no. 6 (June 1973). The PFW was staff-owned and published by a collective that called itself "The Commune." An editorial published in the May 26, 1972 issue under the heading "Our Rap" gives the paper's statement of purpose:

The two titles Grok and Fair Witness are both references to the novel Stranger in a Strange Land by Robert A. Heinlein, a popular touchstone of the 1960s hippie counterculture.
To "grok" is a form of deep holistic comprehension of any thing or situation (similar to hippie/beatnik slang "dig"); while a "Fair Witness" is a (fictional) service provided by a sort of hired court reporter with an eidetic memory who serves as a totally honest bonded eyewitness at any proceeding.  

Contents of the Fair Witness were the usual 1960s underground press mix of underground comix (some originating locally in the Fair Witness; others like Crumb, Bode, etc. distributed nationally through the Alternative Features Syndicate), film, music, and book reviews, coverage of drugs, the occult, New Left and antiwar political activism, the Women's Liberation movement, ecology, etc.; along with local advertising and event and switchboard listings. It was a member of the Underground Press Syndicate and the Liberation News Service. A typical tabloid sized issue ran to about 24 pages and sold for 25 cents.

The Fair Witness was distributed throughout the western Pennsylvania area and locally through a network of about a hundred local shops (head shops, co-ops, record stores, boutiques, book stores, natural food stores, etc.) and was sold on the street by hawkers who kept a dime for every 25 cent copy they sold, picking up bundles for street distribution at The Free People's Store, a co-op on Meyron Avenue in the city's Oakland neighborhood.

See also
 List of underground newspapers of the 1960s counterculture

References

Underground press
Publications established in 1970
Publications disestablished in 1973
Defunct newspapers published in Pittsburgh
1970 establishments in Pennsylvania
1973 disestablishments in Pennsylvania